Chingusai (Hangul: 친구사이, McCune–Reischauer: Ch'in'gusai, RR: Chingusai) is a South Korean gay men's human rights group founded in February 1994. It originated from Chodonghwe, the first organization that advocated for the human rights of the Korean LGBTQ+ community. Chingusai's main focus is to raise awareness on the importance of LGBTQ+ human rights and fight against the prejudices on sexual minorities in South Korea through social activism.

Historical background

1993–1997: The origins of Chingusai 
In December 1993, a group of seven people decided to form Chodonghwe as a way to concentrate their different backgrounds in LGBTQ+ activism. Some people had experience of gay gatherings outside of Korea, some were HIV activists, and others were issued from smaller gatherings such as the veterans of Nakwon-dong, a queer district affiliated to Jongro-gu in Seoul, or Sappho, a lesbian social club created in 1990 predominantly by American expats, US military personnel, and Korean Americans. One month after its creation, Chodonghwe led to the creation of two separate groups: one focused on gay human rights (Chingusai), and the other on lesbian human rights (Kkirikkiri).

Chingusai started their official activities by publishing a newsletter on February 7, 1994, and organizing a seminar on homosexuality soon after on April 3. The same year, some members of the group shared their coming-out experiences through their "first gay memoir" entitled "No longer sad or ashamed" (더 이상 슬프지도 부끄럽지도 않다, Tŏ isang sŭlp'ŭjido pukkŭrŏpchido ant'a, Seoul: Chŏngjamot, 1994). Those first activities were inscribed in an attempt to give more visibility to the LGBTQ+ community in the mainstream media as a way of "transform[ing] the Nakwon-dong culture", a term referring to the obscure gay neighborhood of Nakwon-dong, Jongro-gu. It was introduced by the gay activist Seo Dong-jin, a cultural critic who was the first person to make his coming-out publicly. Aside from his activities in Chingusai, he introduced queer theory in Korea and had a central role in the apparition of LGBTQ+ gatherings in Korean universities.

In comparison to other groups at that time, Chingusai, by appointing public representatives that already made their coming-out, acted as a public organization aiming to raise awareness on LGBTQ+ related issues through meetings, counseling, and publications.

1995–2000: A gay men's human rights group 
Chingsusai took part in the creation of the Korean Council of Homosexual Rights Activist Groups (KCHRAG, 한국동성애자 인권단체 협의회, Han'guk tongsŏngaeja In'kwŏn danch'e hyŏbŭihoe) in 1995 along with Kkirikkiri, Maŭm001 (LGBTQ+ students gathering of Seoul National University), Come Together (LGBTQ+ students gathering of Yonsei University).

On June 28, 1998, KCHRAG merged with other LGBTQ+ human rights related organizations (for a total of 26 groups) and became the Korean Homosexuals Human Rights Association (한국동성애자 단체협의회, Han'guk tongsŏngaeja danch'e hyŏbŭihoe) through a public announcement made in T'apkol park (Jongro). This particular date was chosen as a commemoration of the Stonewall riots One of their first regular activities was to organize every summer starting 1995, a three-day "Summer Human Rights Camp".

In 1997, Chingusai officially stood up as an organization advocating for LGBTQ+ human rights. It was also a significant year for the organization as they decided to concentrate their activities on raising awareness on HIV, destigmatizing the relationship between HIV and gay individuals, but also protecting HIV-seropositive human rights. The reason under that is that one of the first activists of Chingusai, Oh Junsu, was an HIV-seropositive who died in 1998.

In May 1998, Chingusai established their headquarters in Jongro district, Nakwon-dong and a year after in 1999, they received with Kkirikkiri the Felipa de Souza Award from IGLHRC (International Gay and Lesbian Human Rights Commission).

2001–2002: Apparition of online communities and difficulties 
In parallel with the apparition of groups advocating for LGBTQ+ human rights such as Chingusai, also appeared a lot of online communities (BBS) such as Xzone, Hwarang (actually Ivancity) and Tajinet. Those BBS were hosted on the major internet servers at that time (e.g. Hitel, Chollian or Nawnuri).

One of the communities, Xzone (엑스죤), was asked by the Commission of Youth Protection (청소년보호위원회, Ch'ŏngsonyŏnbohowiwŏnhoe) and the Ethics Committee on Information and Communication (정보통신윤리위원회, Chŏngbot'ongshinyulliwiwŏnhoe) to shut down the page for displaying inappropriate content that they qualified under the label "homosexuality". Chingusai and other LGBTQ+ organizations/groups such as Hongkŏjimo, Donginryŏn, Bŏdi and the Seoul Queer Film Festival - reunited under the "Joint Task Force Opposing Discrimination against Homosexuals" (동성애자 차별 반대 공동 행동) - filed a lawsuit and succeeded in suppressing the label "homosexuality" and cancelling the decision of shutting down the website.

First created in 1995, the influence of those online communities grew fast near 2001–2002. They made able for people to communicate instantly and anonymously, in opposition to Chingusai that was more focusing on offline meetings. This raising of popularity of online communities coincided with a period of financial and internal difficulties for Chingusai. Another attempt of unity was made in 2002 along with Kkirikkiri and other organizations called LGBT Korea (한국 동성애자 연합, Han'guk Tongsŏngaeja yŏnhap) but did not get the expected results.

2003–2010: New projects and affirmation of Chingusai's identity 
Starting in 2003, Chingusai took a step aside from the different unions and instead switched back their focus on organizing events and gather people through different ways. For example, a chorus called G_Voice was created in November and is still nowadays a solid trademark of Chingusai. This period also marks the return to financial and administrative stability.

In 2006, Chingusai changed its tagline from "Korean gay men's human rights association" (한국 남성 동성애자 인권운동 단체, Han'guk namsŏng tongsŏngaeja in'gwŏnundong tanch'e) to "Korean gay human rights association" (한국 게이 인권운동 단체, Han'guk gei tongsŏngaeja in'gwŏnundong tanch'e) in order to broaden the target of their action.

If Chingusai would usually change their focus every year in reaction to the different events, they decided in 2010 to settle three main values that would define the three central directions of their plans.

Main values and activities

Facilitate the process of coming out 
If Hong Seok-cheon is famous for being one of the first celebrity to come out, the activists of Chingusai were actually the first to come out in the mainstream media. As a result, one of the main activity of Chingusai is to provide all the tools for the LGBTQ+ community in South Korea to realize a successful Coming Out.

In 2001, Chingusai started the "Coming Out Interview Series" in which members would come out through an interview uploaded on the group website. Once 100 people are gathered, a book compiling the interviews will be published. They released in 2007, a "Coming Out Guide" for people who needed assistance in revealing their sexual identity.

An alternative community (대안의 공동체) 
Another objective of Chingusai is to provide different types of spaces for the LGBTQ+ Korean community to gather.

Chingusai is especially well-known for their offline gatherings such as their swimming club Marine Boy (마린보이, Marin boi), their gay choir G_Voice (지_보이스, ji_poiseu), their hobby-sharing club Saturday Gathering (토요모임, t'oyo moim) and finally their reading club (책읽당, ch'aek iktang).

Even if they first focused on offline communities, Chingusai also has an online community on their website.

An overwhelming change (가슴 벅찬 변화) 
As an important factor in the increasing visibility of the LGBTQ+ community in the Korean mainstream media, Chingusai also took part in a lot of activities related to culture, and especially film production.

Chingusai participated in the production of various movies and documentaries, such as Camellia (동백꽃, Tongbaekkkot) in 2004, celebrating the ten years of the association. Two famous queer movie directors were also the main representative of the association: Lee-song Hee-Il in 1999 and Kim-Jho Gwangsoo in 2013.

Chingusai participated in the production of Kim-Jho Gwangsoo's short movies like Boy Meets Boy (소년, 소년을 만나다) in 2008, and Just Friends? (친구사이, ch'in'gusai) in 2009.

In 2010, Chingusai also co-supervised with the "gathering for a culture embracing sexual minorities" and the movie director Yi Hyŏnsang, a documentary called The Miracle of Jongro. It shows the daily life and coming out of four gay men: a movie director (Lee Hyŏksang), a human rights activist (Jang Pyŏngkwŏn), a cook (Choe Yŏngsu) and an office worker (Chŏng Yul). The movie director Lee Hyŏksang official came out by featuring in this documentary.

List of publications

List of representatives 
 Yi Humyǒng (1994)
 Pak Chinsǒk (1994)
 Yi Rim (1995)
 Kim Chunsǒk (1996)
 Kim Kihyǒn (1997)
 Chǒn Chǒngnam (1998)
 Lee-song Hee-Il (1999)
 Sin Chǒnghan (2000)
 Pak Chǒlmin (2001)
 Pak Chǒlmin, Kim Byǒngsǒk (2002)
 Chǒn Cheu (2003)
 Choe Chunwǒn (2004)
 Pak Kangsǒk (2005)
 Yi Chonggǒl (2006-2007)
 Han Karam (2008-2009)
 Pak Chekyǒng (2010-2012)
 Kim-Jho Gwangsoo (2013)
 Cho Namung (2014-2015)
 Pak Kiho (2016)
 Kim Chanyǒng (2017)
 Kim Kihwan (2019)

See also 
 LGBT history in South Korea
 LGBT rights in South Korea
 Sexuality in South Korea

References 

1994 establishments in Korea
LGBT organizations in South Korea
Organizations established in 1994